Ravenoville is a former commune in the Manche department in north-western France. On 1 January 2019, it was merged into the commune Sainte-Mère-Église.

Geography
Ravenoville is divided into 2 towns: Ravenoville-Bourg and Ravenoville-Plage.  A sinuous route of about 1.25 miles through the pastureland of Normandy links them.

History
Ravenoville, close to Utah Beach, on the evening of June 5, 1944 and throughout the day of June 6, 1944, lived through the Allied D-Day landing.

See also
Communes of the Manche department

References

Former communes of Manche